Aravali Retreat is a 1200-acre gated community, located on  Aravali hill range, approximately 35 kilometers south west  from the Delhi's Indra Gandhi International Airport, in village Raisina, Sohna Tehsil, Gurgaon District, in the National Capital Region of India.

Pathways World School, Aravali, a leading International School, is located in the centre of Aravali Retreat.  The school opened in 2003.   In 2014 it had a student body of 1100 students representing 40 countries.

History
Aravali Retreat,  a 1200-acre project of  630 one and two acre  fenced lots, was developed and marketed by Ansal Properties and Infrastructure (API), a  well known property developer in the NCR. The project was   started in 1988-89. It  was designed  and developed by Colonel Sashi, a retired army engineer from the Indian Army Corps of Engineers. Individual lots were fenced, gated, and linked by  extensive internal roads. On some lots sample cottages were built by the developer. These were subsequently sold. The project was marketed in 1990-92,  after completion of infrastructure.

In 2003 the Pathway School started classes.

In April 2012,  Gurgaon district authorities, demolished several properties in Aravali Retreat. The Aravali Retreat Plot owner's Association (ARPAN) denied that the residents violated any environmental laws including the  Government notification dated 7 May 1992. They claim that the notification was not applicable to the plot owners because the land had been categorized as farmhouse in the revenue records of the state in 1990.

In the last 3 – 4 years, some farmhouses have upgraded their venues as picnic spots under the development scheme of 'farm tourism' by Haryana government, consequently, a large number of visitors are reaching this area for recreation, leisure and day outing purposes especially from Delhi & NCR.

Infrastructure
In the centre of the project there is a club house, now in a state of neglect. Next to the club house, is the  community  or the site offices. These  are housed in a temporary  barrack.   Next to   community/site office   there is experimental orchard with several varieties of citrus fruits.  The residents association has  objected to plans of API to sell the  common areas  such as the community/site office area and  areas next to the  Sheetal and Nirmal lakes. Maintenance of infrastructure, including security, green cover, and trees and flowers along the avenues and road side, are by Star Estate Management Ltd, an affiliate of Ansal properties, which charges owners Rs1200 / per acres per month, i.e., Rs 3971 per quarter, including taxes.  Permissible construction in the natural conservation zone (NCZ) designated as  ecological sensitive zones such as the Aravali Range, is 0.5 per cent of the area, i.e., about 218 square feet for every acre.

Pathways World School
The Pathway school occupies 30 acres prime land. It is co-ed school. it has  with a student body 1100 day school and boarders. It offers International Baccalaureate program. It has extensive extra circular facilities,  student hostels, and on site housing for masters and staff. The day students commute by bus from Delhi and Gurgaon. In August 2014,  the School was awarded  Platinum rating for its 'Leadership in Energy and Environmental Design' (LEED) by the United States Green Building Council.

Access Road
A narrow village road from Badshahpur  through Tikli connects Aravali Retreat to the  main  Gurgaon-Sohna road.  Pathway World School, in coordination with the Municipal Corporation of Gurgaon, Haryana State Public Works Department, and Panchayati Raj, has undertaken to assist with the up gradation of this long-neglected road. The work on the road is expected to be completed before the onset of monsoons in 2014.

Population
The resident population consists of students, teachers, and school staff, of the Pathway School. In addition there is a sizable population of gardeners,  shop keepers, security and maintenance staff. 
The demolitions, and protracted litigation has adversely  affected  owner  and development activity, except in the areas  adjoining and occupied by the school. The total resident population in the project, including the school, is about 2000.

Residents Welfare Association
The  RWA of Aravali Retreat is "Raisina Aravali Retreat Residents Association" (RARRWA), which is registered  in Gurgaon, Haryana, under the Haryana Registration and Regulation of Societies Act 2012 (Haryana Act No. 1 of 2012).  The aim of the association is 'to promote the welfare of the residents of the colony known as Aravali Retreat". Col (Retd) R.P. Suhag, is  the current president of the association. The office address of RARRWA  is : RARRWA Secretariat, Aravali Retreat, Village Raisina,  District Gurgaon. RARRWA also assists plot owners in getting their Girdawaries done.

Litigation
In 2007, the Haryana State Pollution Control, filed charges against API, the developers of Aravali retreat, and some plots owners,  for violating the Aravali Notification dated 7 May 1992. The contention of the state and district authorities is that Aravali Retreat is Aravali Gairmumkin Mountain (Pahad), and that its change to Gairmumkin Farm houses by the district authorities in 1990 is void. In support of this contention it is argued that the  1990 order has been revoked by the Collector of Gurgaon on 23 February 2006. The re-categorization of Aravali Retreat by the district authorities as 'Gairmumkin Pahad' (Mountain), was prompted by Haryana State Pollution Control complaint. The developer, in 2012,  in his deposition   before the court claimed  that the relevant permissions including under the provisions of The Punjab Scheduled Roads and Controlled Areas (Restriction of Unregulated Development) Act,1963 and the Haryana Development and Regulation of Urban Areas Act, 1975 were obtained before starting work, that the Director, Town and Country Planning, Haryana, was informed of the status of the development by means of letters dated 14 May 1991, and that the area was developed after it had been declared as Gairmumkin Farm houses in 1990.

Time line
1988-92 
Ansal Properties and Infrastructure (API),  sells over 630 farms, ranging in size from 1 acre to 2.85 acres,  in a gated  community called Aravali Retreat, near village Raisana, in Sohna Tehsil.  Infrastructure in Aravali Retreat  developed by Ansal Properties  includes  several miles of tarmac roads,  water catchment areas,  trees and shrubbery,  club house,  and sample houses, which were  later sold.   API, according to court documents, before developing  and selling  the lots,  took the relevant permissions  under the provisions of The Punjab Scheduled Roads and Controlled Areas (Restriction of Unregulated Development) Act,1963  and the Haryana Development and Regulation of Urban Areas Act, 1975, as affirmed by  API  court deposition [2012].  Ansals, the developer,  kept the  Director, Town and Country Planning, Haryana,  informed  on the  status of the development  in the area  through  letter dated 14 May 1991.

1992
Ministry Of Environment and Forest (MOEF), on 7 May 1992,   issues a general  notification  covering   areas  shown as "reserved forests, protected forests", (a)  Gair Mumkin Pahar, or (b) Gair Mumkin Rada, or (c) Gair Mumkin Behed, or (d) Banjad Beed, or (e) Rundh, on 7 May 1992 in relation to Gurgaon District in Haryana, and  Alwar District  in Rajasthan .  The notification  prohibits, amongst other things, mining, cutting of trees, construction of any clusters of dwelling units, farms houses, sheds, community centers, information centers and any other activity connected with such construction (including roads and part of any infrastructure relating thereto), and electrification (laying of new transmission lines) in the designated areas .

2003 
Director Town and Country Planning, Haryana,  and  Haryana authorities,  accord permission to   Pathways World School, to construct  a school on a 30 acres plot  in the centre of Aravali retreat. The  International  School opened in 2003, and by 2014  had  a student body  of 1100 students representing 40 countries.

 2006 
Collector of Gurgaon on 23 February revokes  the  1990 notification   and categorizes  Aravali Retreat as  Gair Mumkin Pahar.

Ministry Of Environment and Forest (MOEF) on 1 November 2006 issues clarification  stating  that  the notification   of 7 May 1992   does not apply to Aravali Retreat, as  plots on it were categorized as ‘farm houses’ prior to the issue of  the  1992 notification.  The MOEF  clarification noted:  "In case the members of Aravali Plot Owners’ association have plots which in the land records maintained by the State Government as on the date of the Notification i.e. 7 May 1992 were categorized as "Farm House" i.e. not categorized in any of the categories i.e., a) "Gair Mumkin Pahal or b)"Gair Mumkin Rada or c) Gair Mumkin Behed or d) Banjad Beed or d) Banjad Beed or e) Rundh, then this Notification will not be applicable".

2007
Haryana State Pollution Control, initiates litigation against Ansal API, the developers of Aravali retreat, and many plots owners, for violation of Aravali Notification dated 7 May 1992.

Special Environment Court, Faridabad,   rules that  according to documentary evidence  submitted in the court  Aravali Retreat   is shown as  the  "Gair Mumkin Farm land"  in  revenue record of 1990-91 and not Gair Mumkin Pahar.
 
Special Environment Court, Faridabad,  in the case filed  by Haryana State Pollution Control Board (HSPCB) rules in favor of Ansals. In its judgment  the court states:  "Thus the complainant/prosecution has miserably failed to prove upon file that Aravali Notification was applicable upon the Aravali Retreat the land of accused no.1 and he has further failed to prove upon file that any construction in any shape was made by accused no.1 after the issuance of Aravali Notification. Even no any construction by accused no.1 after re- change of Khasra Girdawari has been shown to be made. Hence accused no.1 is liable to be acquitted of the charge framed under section 15 of The Environment Protection Act for violation of Aravali Notification dated 7.5.1992".

2012
Aravali Retreat Plots Owners Association [ARPAN] is registered in Delhi  under the Haryana Registration and Regulation of Societies Act, 2012. On 4 April 2013  (RARRWA)  is registered  as a society under the Haryana registration and Regulation of Societies, with   Office address as : CL 8, Aravali Retreat, Village Raisina,  District Gurgaon.
Prompted by complaint by Haryana State Pollution Control, the Gurgaon district authorities demolished some dwelling units in Aravali Retreat. The contention of the state and district authorities is that Aravali Retreat is Aravali Gairmumkin Pahad, (Mountain) and that its change to Gairmumkin Farm houses by the district authorities in 1990 is void. The Aravali Retreat Plot owner's Association denies that the residents  violated any environmental laws including  Notification dated 7 May 1992. They claim that the notification was not applicable to the plot owners because the land had been categorized as farmhouse in the revenue records of the state in 1990, i.e., prior to the 1992 notification.

 2014 
National Green Tribunal established on 18.10.2010 under the National Green Tribunal Act 2010 for effective and expeditious disposal of cases relating to environmental protection,  in response to  illegal constructions in  some areas  of the Aravali,  especially Raisina Hill, Sohna, Gulaphari, Sokandarpur and Wazirabad,  in May, directed  the  Haryana government to identify  and  submit  schedule for demolition of illegal constructions.

June 2014
RARRWA representatives meet Mr. Mann, the District Town Planner, Enforcement.    Official of District Town Planner informs  President RARRWA that the current problems being faced  by some of  the  Aravali retreat residents and owners  is  because API, the developers of the Aravali Retreat,  failed to submit Taksim  and road layout plans in the 1990s  when the area was developed.

3 July  2014
President, RARRWA, on behalf of the residents of Aravali retreat,  writes to Sushil Ansal, Chairman,  Ansal API, documenting the concern of  Aravali retreat owners. These included the  sale by API of areas around Nirmal lake  and the  site office; changes in the  ecology of the Nirmal  and Sheetal lakes;   and  illegal felling of trees. The letter  also requested   Mr Sushil Ansal, to  urgently  submit the Taksim, and the layout of roads to the Country Planning Department so that  relevant records can be brought up to date. The letter demands that the common assets be handed over to  the residents association.

4 July 2014 
District Town Planner, Enforcement Gurgaon, [ HUDA Complex, Sector 14]  issues  show cause notice to  some  farm owners for alleged contravention of section 6  and sub section (i) of section 7 of Punjab Scheduled Roads and Controlled Areas restriction of Unregulated Development Act, 1963.  The farm owners  directed to produce  authenticated copies of [a] registration deed [b] Nakal Jamabandi [c] Khasra Girdawri [d]  Sajra plan [e] Site Plan [f]  Any approval from the competent authority.

13 August 2014 
President RARRWA  writes  to  Sushil Ansal, Chairman,  Ansal API,  reminding him of  API's obligations to owners.  Letter urges  the chairman of API  to  urgently  get the Taksim done in compliance   with the requirement of Town and Country Planning Department, Haryana, and hand over the roads in the Aravali Retreat.

October 2014
Hawa Singh, Patwari,   alters existing revenue records of all Aravali Retreat Farm owners, without exception, which  showed Bag Bagicha, Makan,  to "Gair Mumkin Pahar" which  attracts a  number of restrictions under the Aravali Notification of 1992.

 February 2015
President Raisina Aravali Retreat Residents Welfare Association,  submits a petition to the CM of Haryana  containing  the legal history of Aravali Retreat.

 March 2015
A delegation   of Aravali Retreat Farm Owners,  which included several army officers,  led by President  of Raisina Aravali Retreat Residents Welfare Association, met with  T L Satyaprakash, IAS, Deputy Commissioner Gurgaon on 26 March at 10 am at First Floor, Mini Secretariat, to register their complaint on the unauthorized  and post facto change in the status of the land in Aravali retreat to "Gair Mumkin Pahar".  The DC in response to the written petition and deposition by the delegation  ordered the Additional Deputy Commissioner to prepare a "white paper to solve the problems once for all through a committee".  During the meeting a   senior officials  from the DC office  said  that every time he visited Aravali retreat  he found more greenery than  before. The  delegation was informed that   Aravali Retreat as per the latest master plan of Haryana, comes under the zone in which  agricultural activities are permitted including construction for  taking care of the agricultural and vegetable produce on the farms.

 April 2016
On 24 April 2016 Elections were held for the various positions and for the Board of Management of the association. The entire team of office bearers and the Board was elected unopposed by the members of RARRWA. Col (Retd) R.P. Suhag has been elected as the new President of RARRWA.

References 

Gurgaon
Gurgaon district